Elísabet Gunnarsdóttir (born 2 October 1976) is an Icelandic football coach and former player, currently in charge of Swedish Damallsvenskan club Kristianstads DFF. Elísabet was the head coach of the Icelandic Úrvalsdeild kvenna team Valur from 2003 to 2008; during which her team won four league titles and one cup title. Elísabet became head coach of Kristianstads DFF in the Swedish women's football league, Damallsvenskan, in January 2009. In 2013 Elísabet appeared in the Sveriges Television documentary television series The Other Sport.

Playing career

Club
Elísabet started with Valur FC as a youth player and progressed to the senior team before moving to Stjarnan in 1995 and playing two seasons with the club. She then rejoined her mother club Valur FC in 1997 and played until 2001 when she decided to retire and take over IBV in the highest women´s league as the head coach. At the age of 24 years, Elísabet became the youngest ever female to work as a head coach in the highest division.

Coaching career

Youth teams
Elísabet got her start in coaching at the age of 16 when she joined the youth program at Valur FC as an assistant coach. For nine years she coached different age groups at the club and played a big part in building one of the most organized and successful youth programs on the women's side in Iceland. She won many national trophies with her youth teams and was named Iceland's 1999 youth team coach of the year.

Senior teams
In 2001 Elísabet left her mother club Valur FC for the opportunity of coaching ÍBV in the Úrvalsdeild kvenna.  After one year with ÍBV she took over Breiðablik's under-19 team and guided them to the Icelandic championship. In 2003, she was hired by Valur as the senior team's head coach, winning the club's first league title in 15 years and being named the 2003 Coach of the Year. Elísabet remained Valur's head coach for five consecutive seasons, leading the team to four league titles and one cup title. She took the team all the way to the quarter finals of the 2005–06 UEFA Women's Cup. Elísabet is known for making high-profile transfers for her teams and brought players like German world champion Viola Odebrecht and Scottish Julie Fleeting to Iceland to play for her at Valur FC.

Elísabet moved to Sweden in January 2009 to take over Kristianstads DFF of the Swedish Damallsvenskan. She has been leading the team as a head coach for six consecutive seasons and has helped the club develop their organization and show some good results from season to season. Through her time at the club Kristiantads DFF has signed some big names including Icelandic stars Margrét Lára Viðarsdóttir and Sif Atladóttir, Danish international Johanna Rasmussen and Swedish stars Hedvig Lindahl (sold to Chelsea 2015), Kosovare Asllani (sold to PSG 2012) and Josefine Öqvist (sold to Montpellier 2013). In September 2012 Elísabet signed a new two-year contract with the club.

In August 2014, Marija Banušić gave Kristianstads the lead in the Svenska Cupen final, but Elísabet's team were defeated 2–1 by Linköpings FC.

National teams 
Elísabet served as an assistant to Jörundur Áki Sveinsson for the Icelandic women's national team and was also the head coach for the U-21 national team from 2005 to 2007.

When Freyr Alexandersson—Elísabet's former assistant and successor at Valur—was named Icelandic women's team coach in 2013, she agreed to scout opposition teams on his behalf.

Honours

Managerial honours
Valur
 Icelandic Champions (4): 2004, 2006, 2007, 2008
 Icelandic Cup: 2006

Individual
 Úrvalsdeild kvenna Coach of the year (4): 2004, 2006, 2007, 2008
 Damallsvenskan Coach of the year: 2017
 Runner-up: 2012
 Svenska Cupen Damer Runner-up (2): 2014, 2019

References

External links

 
 

1976 births
Living people
Elisabet Gunnarsdottir
Elisabet Gunnarsdottir
Female association football managers
Elisabet Gunnarsdottir
Women's association footballers not categorized by position
Elisabet Gunnarsdottir
Elisabet Gunnarsdottir
Elisabet Gunnarsdottir
Elisabet Gunnarsdottir
Elisabet Gunnarsdottir